Citizens for Decent Literature was a pro-censorship advocacy body founded in 1956 in Cincinnati, Ohio by the Roman Catholic anti-pornography campaigner Charles Keating which advocated reading classics, not "smut". Many priests were also involved in this organization.

It was later renamed a number of times to various names, the best known of which was Citizens for Decency through Law.

It would grow to 300 chapters and 100,000 members nationwide and become the largest anti-pornography organization in the nation.  Over the following 20 years the organization mailed some 40 million letters on behalf of its position and had filed amicus curiae briefs.

Under the name Citizens for Decency through Law, the CDL was still active as of 2002, although it did not have a website.

See also 
 Churchmen's Committee for Decent Publications
 National Legion of Decency
 National Organization for Decent Literature

References 

Book censorship in the United States
1956 establishments in Ohio
Christian organizations based in the United States